Wassberg may refer to:
People
 Roy Wassberg, a Norwegian footballer, most known for his two runs in SK Brann
 Thomas Wassberg, a Swedish former cross-country skier
Places
 a mountain which is part of the Forch area in the canton of Zürich in Switzerland